Italy competed at the 1948 Summer Olympics in London, England. 215 competitors, 195 men and 20 women, took part in 89 events in 16 sports.

Medalists

Athletics

Results

Basketball

Men's Team Competition
Team Roster
Gianfranco Bersani
Carlo Cerioni
Federico Marietti
Giancarlo Marinelli
Giancarlo Primo
Renzo Ranuzzi
Luigi Rapini
Romeo Romanutti
Sergio Stefanini
Vittorio Tracuzzi

Boxing

Cycling

Twelve cyclists, all men, represented Italy in 1948.

Individual road race
 Adolfo Ferrari
 Silvio Pedroni
 Franco Fanti
 Livio Isotti

Team road race
 Adolfo Ferrari
 Silvio Pedroni
 Franco Fanti
 Livio Isotti

Sprint
 Mario Ghella

Time trial
 Gino Guerra

Tandem
 Ferdinando Terruzzi
 Renato Perona

Team pursuit
 Arnaldo Benfenati
 Guido Bernardi
 Anselmo Citterio
 Rino Pucci

Equestrian

Fencing

19 fencers, 16 men and 3 women, represented Italy in 1948.

Men's foil
 Manlio Di Rosa
 Renzo Nostini
 Giuliano Nostini

Men's team foil
 Edoardo Mangiarotti, Manlio Di Rosa, Renzo Nostini, Giuliano Nostini, Giorgio Pellini, Saverio Ragno

Men's épée
 Gino Cantone
 Edoardo Mangiarotti
 Carlo Agostoni

Men's team épée
 Edoardo Mangiarotti, Carlo Agostoni, Dario Mangiarotti, Gino Cantone, Marco Antonio Mandruzzato, Fiorenzo Marini

Men's sabre
 Vincenzo Pinton
 Gastone Darè
 Carlo Turcato

Men's team sabre
 Vincenzo Pinton, Gastone Darè, Carlo Turcato, Mauro Racca, Aldo Montano, Renzo Nostini

Women's foil
 Velleda Cesari
 Irene Camber-Corno
 Elena Libera

Football

Men's Team Competition
Team Roster
Giuseppe Casari
Guglielmo Giovannini
Adone Stellin
Tommaso Maestrelli
Maino Neri
Giacomo Mari
Emidio Cavigioli
Angelo Turconi
Francesco Pernigo
Valerio Cassani
Emilio Caprile
Glauco Vanz
Franco Antonazzi
Romolo Bizzoto
Renzo Burini
Egisto Pandolfini
Cesare Presca 
Enzo Menegotto

Gymnastics

Men's team competition
Team roster
Egidio Armelloni
Guido Figone
Danilo Fioravanti
Domenico Grosso
Savino Guglielmetti
Ettore Perego
Quinto Vadi
Luigi Zanetti

Women's team competition
Team roster
Renata Bianchi
Norma Icardi
Licia Macchini
Laura Micheli
Wanda Nuti
Luciana Pezzoni
Elena Santoni
Lilia Torriani

Modern pentathlon

Three male pentathletes represented Italy in 1948.

 Giulio Palmonella
 Roberto Curcio
 Duilio Brignetti

Rowing

Italy had 26 male rowers participate in all seven rowing events in 1948.

 Men's single sculls
 Romolo Catasta

 Men's double sculls
 Francesco Dapiran
 Mario Ustolin

 Men's coxless pair
 Bruno Boni
 Felice Fanetti

 Men's coxed pair
 Alberto Radi
 Giovanni Steffè
 Aldo Tarlao

 Men's coxless four
 Franco Faggi
 Giovanni Invernizzi
 Giuseppe Moioli
 Elio Morille

 Men's coxed four
 Domenico Cambieri
 Riccardo Cerutti
 Francesco Gotti
 Renato Macario
 Reginaldo Polloni

 Men's eight
 Angelo Fioretti
 Mario Acchini
 Fortunato Maninetti
 Bonifacio De Bortoli
 Enrico Ruberti
 Pietro Sessa
 Ezio Acchini
 Luigi Gandini
 Alessandro Bardelli

Sailing

Shooting

Six shooters represented Italy in 1948.

25 metre pistol
 Michelangelo Borriello
 Walter Boninsegni
 Ferdinando Bernini

50 metre pistol
 Stefano Margotti

50 metre rifle
 Rinaldo Capuzzi
 Luigi Adami

Water polo

Men's Team Competition
Team Roster
Ermenegildo Arena
Pasquale Buonocore
Emilio Bulgarelli
Aldo Ghira
Mario Maioni
Germinio Ognio
Gianfranco Pandolfini
Tullio Pandolfini
Cesare Rubini

Weightlifting

Wrestling

Art competitions

References

External links
Official Olympic Reports
International Olympic Committee results database
 

Nations at the 1948 Summer Olympics
1948
1948 in Italian sport